HMS Black Prince was a 74-gun third rate ship of the line of the Black Prince class of the Royal Navy, launched on 30 March 1816 at Woolwich Dockyard.

In 1848 Black Prince became a prison ship at Chatham, and she was broken up in 1855.

Notes

References

Lavery, Brian (2003) The Ship of the Line - Volume 1: The development of the battlefleet 1650–1850. Conway Maritime Press. .
Winfield, Rif (2008) British Warships in the Age of Sail 1793-1817: Design, Construction, Careers and Fates. 2nd edition, Seaforth Publishing, 2008. .

External links
 

Ships of the line of the Royal Navy
Black Prince-class ships of the line
Prison ships
Ships built in Woolwich
1816 ships
Edward the Black Prince